ONE 163: Akimoto vs. Petchtanong was a Combat sport event produced by ONE Championship that took place on November 19, 2022, at the Singapore Indoor Stadium in Kallang, Singapore.

Background
A ONE Bantamweight Kickboxing World Championship bout between current champion Hiroki Akimoto and Petchtanong Petchfergus served as the event headliner.

The ONE Heavyweight Kickboxing World Grand Prix Tournament Final bout between current ONE Light Heavyweight Kickboxing Champion Roman Kryklia and Iraj Azizpour served as the event's co-headliner. The pairing first met at Kunlun Fight 69 on February 4, 2018 for the 2018 Kunlun Fight +100kg Tournament, where Azizpour won by extra round majority decision. Their second meeting took place at Kunlun Fight 80 on February 24, 2019 for the 2019 Kunlun Fight +100kg Tournament, where Kryklia won by unanimous decision. The pairing was previously scheduled to headlined at ONE: NextGen for the inaugural ONE Heavyweight Kickboxing World Championship bout, but Kryklia withdraw due to an undisclosed medical issue.

A middleweight bout between former ONE Middleweight and Light Heavyweight World Champion Aung La Nsang and former UFC and WSOF Middleweight title contender Yushin Okami was originally expected to take place at ONE on Prime Video 4, but was postponed to this event for unknown reasons.

Kwon Won Il and Mark Abelardo were scheduled to meet in a bantamweight bout at ONE on Prime Video 4, but on November 4, it was announced that the bout will be moved to this event instead.

At the weigh-ins, Itsuki Hirata, Yuya Wakamatsu and Asahi Shinagawa all failed hydration test and were forced to take catchweights. Wakamatsu weighed in at 139 lbs, 4 pounds over the limit, Shinagawa came in at 126 lbs, 1 pounds over the limit, and Hirata failed weight and hydration. The bout proceeded at catchweight with Wakamatsu being fined 40% of his purse, which went to his opponent Woo Sung Hoon; Shinagawa being fined 20% of his purse, which went to his opponent Rui Botelho. but Hirata was scheduled to face former Rizin Women's Super Atomweight Champion Seo Hee Ham was the bout scrapped due to Hirata failed weight and hydration, and Ham did not agree to compete.

Results

Bonus awards
The following fighters received $50,000 bonuses.
Performance of the Night: Roman Kryklia, Saygid Izagakhmaev, Woo Sung Hoon and Bianca Basilio

See also 

 2022 in ONE Championship
 List of ONE Championship events
 List of current ONE fighters

References 

Events in Singapore
ONE Championship events
2022 in mixed martial arts
Mixed martial arts in Singapore
Sports competitions in Singapore
November 2022 sports events in Singapore